Ricardo Burgos (born 4 March 1965) is a Guatemalan cross-country skier.  He and his younger brother Dag both represented their country at the 1988 Winter Olympics in Calgary, where they each competed in the Men's 15 kilometre and the Men's 20 kilometre races.

In each case, the brothers completed the races, but were near to last place among the finishers. Dag came 81st out of 85 finishers in the 15km race and 83rd out of 87 finishers in the 30km race.

References 
 

1965 births
Living people
Guatemalan male cross-country skiers
Olympic cross-country skiers of Guatemala
Cross-country skiers at the 1988 Winter Olympics